In Nazi Germany, the Aryan certificate/passport was a document which certified that a person was a member of the presumed Aryan race. Beginning in April 1933, it was required from all employees and officials in the public sector, including education, according to the Law for the Restoration of the Professional Civil Service. It was also a primary requirement to become a Reich citizen for those who were of German or related blood (Aryan) and wanted to become Reich citizens after the Nuremberg Laws were passed in 1935. A "Swede or an Englishman, a Frenchman or Czech, a Pole or Italian" was considered to be related, that is, "Aryan".

There were two main types:
Kleiner Ariernachweis (Lesser Aryan certificate) was one of:
Seven birth or baptism certificates (or a combination of both) (the person, his parents and grandparents) and three marriage certificates (parents and grandparents) or certified proofs thereof:
Ahnenpaß (literally ancestor's passport)
Ahnentafel, a certified genealogy table
Großer Ariernachweis (Greater Aryan certificate) was required for compliance with the requirements of the Reichserbhofgesetz (land heritage law) and membership in the Nazi party. This certificate had to trace the family pedigree down to 1800 (to 1750 for SS officers). According to the especially strict regulation of this law which included the goal of "Preserving the Purity of German Blood," the only eligible were those who could prove (reaching back to January 1, 1800) that "none of their paternal nor their maternal ancestors had Jewish or colored blood".

Legal relevance today
Among other documents, the Aryan certificate is still recognised today by German authorities as proof of nationality, since it contains officially certified birth and marriage data, which are deemed to be a substitute for corresponding original documents.

See also
 Aryan clause
German Blood Certificate, for Mischlinge (people of mixed origin)
 Ahnenpass
Italian Fascism and racism 
Limpieza de sangre
 Nazi racial theories
 Nuremberg Laws
 Racial policy of Nazi Germany
 Bryan Mark Rigg

References

Nicholas John Fogg, 'German genealogy during the Nazi period (1933-1945)', in Genealogists' Magazine, vol. 30, no. 9 (London: March 2012) pages 347–362.

Nazi eugenics
Identity documents of Nazi Germany